Gerard Delanty (born 1960) is a British-based sociologist and Professor of Sociology and Social & Political Thought at the University of Sussex.
He is also the editor of European Journal of Social Theory.

Bibliography
 Delanty, Gerard (2013) Formations of European modernity: a historical and political sociology of Europe. Palgrave Macmillan, London.  (In Press)
 Delanty, Gerard, ed. (2012) Handbook of cosmopolitanism studies. Routledge International Handbooks . Routledge. 
 Delanty, Gerard, Giorgi, Liana and Sassatelli, Monica, eds. (2011) Festivals and the Cultural Public Sphere. Routledge Advances in Sociology . Routledge, Abingdon and New York. 
 Delanty, Gerard and Turner, Stephen (2011) Routledge International Handbook of Contemporary Social and Political Theory. Routledge International Handbooks . Routledge, Abingdon and New York. 
 Inglis, David and Delanty, Gerard, eds. (2010) Cosmopolitanism. Critical Concepts in the Social Sciences, 1-4 . Routledge. 
 Delanty, Gerard (2009) The cosmopolitan imagination: the renewal of critical social theory. Cambridge University Press, Cambridge. 
 Delanty, Gerard (2009) The European Heritage: History, Memory and Time. In: The SAGE Handbook of European Studies. SAGE Publications, London, pp. 36–51. 
 Delanty, Gerard, Jones, Paul and Wodak, Ruth, eds. (2008) Identity, belonging and migration. Studies in Social and Political Thought . Liverpool University Press, Liverpool. 
 Delanty, Gerard and Rumford, Chris (2005) Rethinking Europe: Social Theory and the Implications of Europeanization. Routledge, Abingdon and New York. 
 Delanty, Gerard (2005) Social Science: Philosophical and Methodological Foundations (Second Edition). Concepts in the Social Sciences . Open University Press, Maidenhead. 
 Delanty, Gerard (2003) Community. Key Ideas . Routledge, London. 
 Delanty, Gerard and O'Mahony, Patrick (2002) Nationalism and Social Theory: Modernity and the Recalcitrance of Nation. Sage Publications Ltd., London. 
 Delanty, Gerard (2001) Challenging knowledge: the university in the knowledge society. Open University Press, Buckingham. 
 Delanty, Gerard (2000) Citizenship in the global age: culture, society and politics. Open University Press, Buckingham. 
 Delanty, Gerard (2000) Modernity and postmodernity: knowledge, power, the self. SAGE Publications, London. 
 Delanty, Gerard (1999) Social Theory in a Changing World: Conceptions of Modernity. Polity Press, Cambridge. 
 Delanty, Gerard (1997) Social Science: Beyond Realism and Constructivism. Concepts in the Social Sciences . Open University Press, Buckingham. 
 Delanty, Gerard (1995) Inventing Europe: Idea, Identity, Reality. Palgrave Macmillan, Basingstoke.

References

External links
 Gerard Delanty (University of Sussex)

Living people
English sociologists
Academics of the University of Sussex
Academics of the University of Liverpool
Writers about globalization
1960 births